Close Your Eyes is the debut studio album by Kurt Elling, released in 1995.

At the 38th Grammy Awards Elling was nominated for the Grammy Award for Best Jazz Vocal Performance for Close Your Eyes.

Reception

The Allmusic review by Michael G. Nastos awarded the album four stars, and said "Chicago vocalist Elling pushes the envelope, challenging listeners and his musicians with beat poetry, ranting, and his Mark Murphy-ish singing. There's quite a bit of dramatist/actor in Elling, although the romantic in him is also pretty prevalent...There's clearly more in store for Elling as he matures, but this is as auspicious a vocal jazz debut as the world has heard.a worthy statement from Elling, who shows yet again that vocal jazz can be more than just easy listening"

Track listing
 "Close Your Eyes" (Bernice Petkere) - 6:06
 "Dolores Dream" (Wayne Shorter, Kurt Elling) - 6:32
 "Ballad of the Sad Young Men" (Tommy Wolf, Fran Landesman) - 6:17
 "(Hide the) Salomé" (Elling, Laurence Hobgood) - 6:59
 "Married Blues" (Hobgood, Eric Hochberg, Paul Wertico, Kenneth Rexroth) - 1:29
 "Storyteller Experiencing Total Confusion" (Edward Petersen, Elling, Jim Heynen) - 6:15
 "Never Say Goodbye" (Elling, Hobgood) - 5:30
 "Those Clouds Are Heavy, You Dig?" (Dave Brubeck, Paul Desmond, Elling) - 3:07
 "Wait till You See Her" (Richard Rodgers, Lorenz Hart) - 3:57
 "Hurricane" (Herbie Hancock, Elling) - 4:50
 "Now It Is Time That Gods Came Walking Out" (Hobgood, Hochberg, Wertico, Rainer Maria Rilke) - 2:03
 "Never Never Land" (Jule Styne, Betty Comden, Adolph Green) - 5:00
 "Remembering Veronica" (Elling, Hobgood) - 4:16

Personnel
Kurt Elling - vocals, arrangements 
Laurence Hobgood - piano (on all tracks except 8), synthesizer (tracks 7, 12, 13), arrangements
Eric Hochberg - double bass (exc. 3, 6-9)
Rob Amster - double bass (6, 8), electric bass (7, 12)
Paul Wertico - drums (exc. 3, 8, 9), percussion (12)
Von Freeman - tenor saxophone (4)
Edward Petersen - tenor saxophone (6, 10)
David Onderdonk - acoustic and electric guitar (7)

Production
Laurence Hobgood - producer
Kurt Elling, Paul Wertico - co-producers
Lorenzo De' Medici - executive producer
Roger Heiss - recording and mixing engineer
Ed Bialach - assistant engineer
Brigid Pearson - design
Jimmy Katz, Bette Marshall - photography

References

Blue Note Records albums
Kurt Elling albums
1995 debut albums